Qaleh Sefid-e Olya (also Romanized as Qal‘eh Sefīd-e ‘Olyā; also known as Qal‘a Shahin, Qal‘eh Sefīd, Qal‘eh Sefīd-e Qāsem, Qal‘eh Sefīd-e Qasen, Qal‘eh Shāhin, and Qal‘eh-ye Safīd) is a village in Qaleh Shahin Rural District, in the Central District of Sarpol-e Zahab County, Kermanshah Province, Iran. At the 2006 census, its population was 156, in 32 families.

References 

Populated places in Sarpol-e Zahab County